General Lamadrid is a department of La Rioja Province (Argentina).

References 

Departments of La Rioja Province, Argentina